The Lè Architecture is an office building located in Nangang District, Taipei, Taiwan. The building was designed by the international architectural firm Aedas and was completed in 2017. The building has received a LEED Gold energy label.

Design
Situated by the Keelung River in the fast-emerging southeastern district of Nangang in Taipei, Lè Architecture aims to convey traditional Taiwanese culture of roundness, strength and elegance with a modern twist by using an egg-shaped exterior design, which was inspired from the small pebbles in the Keelung River. Aiming to minimise energy demands, the building employs several sustainable features, such as a green façade that can lower the interior temperature by acting as a shade to reduce heat gain. Furthermore, natural light is allowed to enter the building by the use of vertical aluminium fins to control the amount of sunlight streaming through the windows. The trees planted in the exterior aims to act as air filters for the building.

Awards
CTBUH Award 2019: Best Tall Building under 100 meters 2019 Award of Excellence
Architizer A+ Popular Choice Awards 2018

See also 
 One Park Taipei
 Tao Zhu Yin Yuan
 Nangang District, Taipei
 Aedas

References

2017 establishments in Taiwan
Office buildings completed in 2017
Skyscraper office buildings in Taipei
Postmodern architecture in Taiwan
Futurist architecture